Porter House Bar and Grill is an upscale steakhouse located on the fourth floor of the Deutsche Bank Center near Masa and Per Se. The restaurant was opened by Michael Lomonaco in 2006, the former executive chef of Windows on the World restaurant atop the World Trade Center's North Tower, which was destroyed by the September 11 attacks. Porter House specializes in serving USDA Prime dry-aged beef but also has a large selection of fish, poultry, and wild game.

The restaurant, designed by Jeffrey Beers International was named “Best Steakhouse in New York” by New York Magazine in 2018. Porter House New York can seat approximately 250 people.

See also
 List of restaurants in New York City
 List of steakhouses

References

External links

Restaurants established in 2006
2006 establishments in New York City
Steakhouses in New York City